Janine van der Meer (born 17 February 1994) is a Dutch former professional racing cyclist, who rode professionally between 2013 and 2014, and 2018 to 2019 for the ,  and  teams.

Major Results
2018
 1st Diamond Tour
 2nd GP Sofie Goos
 5th Omloop van de IJsseldelta
 10th Overall Tour of Uppsala
 10th Overall Erondegemse Pijl
2019
 8th Diamond Tour

References

External links

1994 births
Living people
Dutch female cyclists
Place of birth missing (living people)
Sportspeople from Ridderkerk
Cyclists from South Holland
21st-century Dutch women